The 2016 Betway World Cup of Darts was the sixth edition of the PDC World Cup of Darts. It took place between 2–5 June 2016 at the Eissporthalle in Frankfurt, Germany.

The England pairing of Phil Taylor and Adrian Lewis retained their title after beating the Netherlands pairing of Michael van Gerwen and Raymond van Barneveld 3–2 in the final.

Format
The tournament remained at 32 teams this year, but unlike recent years, only the top 8 teams are seeded, with the remaining 24 teams being unseeded in the first round. Like last year, there are no groups in 2016 with the tournament being a straight knockout.

First round: Best of nine legs doubles.
Second round, quarter and semi-finals: Two best of seven legs singles matches. If the scores are tied a best of seven legs doubles match will settle the match.
Final: Three points needed to win the title. Two best of seven legs singles matches are played followed by a best of seven doubles match. If necessary, one or two best of seven legs singles matches in reverse order are played to determine the champion.

Prize money
Prize money remained at £250,000 as it was at last year's tournament. The prize money was per team:

Teams and seeding
In a change to the seeding system used in recent PDC World Cup of Darts tournaments, only the top 8 countries were seeded, with the remaining 24 teams being unseeded. The only change in countries saw Greece make their debut, in place of India.

The ranking of the seeded nations was confirmed on 23 May 2016.

Seeded nations

Unseeded nations (alphabetic order)

Results

Draw

Second round
Two best of seven legs singles matches. If the scores were tied, a best of seven legs doubles match will settle the match.

Quarter-finals
Two best of seven legs singles matches. If the scores were tied, a best of seven legs doubles match will settle the match.

Semi-finals
Two best of seven legs singles matches. If the scores were tied, a best of seven legs doubles match will settle the match.

Final
Three match wins were needed to win the title. Two best of seven legs singles matches followed by a best of seven doubles match. If necessary, one or two best of seven legs reverse singles matches are played to determine the champion.

References

2016
World Cup
PDC World Cup of Darts
Sports competitions in Frankfurt